Mohamed Shoib (born 12 September 1977) is a Singaporean cricketer. He played in the 2014 ICC World Cricket League Division Three tournament. His last appearance was on 29 August 2017.

References

External links
 

1977 births
Living people
Singaporean cricketers
Place of birth missing (living people)
Southeast Asian Games gold medalists for Singapore
Southeast Asian Games silver medalists for Singapore
Southeast Asian Games medalists in cricket
Competitors at the 2017 Southeast Asian Games